was a  after Gennin and before Antei. This period spanned the years from April 1225 to December 1227.

Change of era
 1225 :  The era name was changed to mark an event or a number of events. The previous era ended and a new one commenced in Gennin 2.

Events of the Karoku Era
 1225 (Karoku 1, 11th month): At Kamakura,  Kujō Yoritsune's coming of age ceremonies took place at age 8; but control of all bakufu affairs remained entirely in the hands of  Hōjō Yasutoki, the regent (shikken).
 1225 (Karoku 1, 12th month): Emperor Go-Horikawa went in formal procession to Iwashimizu Hachiman-gū and to the Kamo Shrines.
 1226 (Karoku 2, 1st month): The Emperor raised Yoritsune to the first rank of the fifth class in the apex of artistocratic court hierarchy (the dōjō kuge).

Notes

References
 Nussbaum, Louis-Frédéric and Käthe Roth. (2005).  Japan encyclopedia. Cambridge: Harvard University Press. ;  OCLC 58053128
 Titsingh, Isaac. (1834). Nihon Odai Ichiran; ou,  Annales des empereurs du Japon.  Paris: Royal Asiatic Society, Oriental Translation Fund of Great Britain and Ireland. OCLC 5850691
 Varley, H. Paul. (1980). A Chronicle of Gods and Sovereigns: Jinnō Shōtōki of Kitabatake Chikafusa. New York: Columbia University Press. ;  OCLC 6042764

External links
 National Diet Library, "The Japanese Calendar" -- historical overview plus illustrative images from library's collection

Japanese eras
1220s in Japan